Mihăilescu is a Romanian surname that may refer to:

Alexandru Mihailescu, Romanian athlete
Nicolae Mihăilescu, Romanian fencer
Preda Mihăilescu
Vintilă Mihăilescu
Ștefan Mihăilescu-Brăila
Anca Grigoraș later Mihăilescu

Romanian-language surnames